These Foolish Things may refer to:
 These Foolish Things (Remind Me of You), 1935 popular song
These Foolish Things (album) (1973), Bryan Ferry singing standards 
These Foolish Things (film) (2005), based on Noel Langley's novel There's a Porpoise Close Behind us
These Foolish Things (revue), a 1938 British revue
Daddy Nostalgie, 1990 French-English film starring Dirk Bogarde, released as These Foolish Things in the UK